The second stage of the 2013 Copa Libertadores de América was played from February 12 to April 18, 2013. A total of 32 teams competed in the second stage.

Draw
The draw of the tournament was held on December 21, 2012, 11:00 UTC−3, at the CONMEBOL Convention Centre in Luque, Paraguay.

For the second stage, the 32 teams were drawn into eight groups of four containing one team from each of the four seeding pots. The seeding of each team was determined by their association and qualifying berth (as per the rotational agreement established by CONMEBOL, the teams which qualified through berths 1 from Colombia, Ecuador, Peru and Venezuela were seeded into Pot 1 for odd-numbered years, while the teams which qualified through berths 1 from Bolivia, Chile, Paraguay and Uruguay were seeded into Pot 1 for even-numbered years). Teams from the same association in Pots 1 and 3 could not be drawn into the same group. However, a first stage winner, whose identity was not known at the time of the draw, could be drawn into the same group with another team from the same association.

Seeding
The following were the seeding of the 32 teams entered into the second stage draw, which included the 26 automatic qualifiers and the 6 first stage winners:

The following were the first stage winners:
Winner G1:  Tigre
Winner G2:  Grêmio
Winner G3:  Deportes Tolima
Winner G4:  Olimpia
Winner G5:  São Paulo
Winner G6:  Iquique

Format
In the second stage, each group was played on a home-and-away round-robin basis. Each team earned 3 points for a win, 1 point for a draw, and 0 points for a loss. If tied on points, the following criteria were used to determine the ranking: 1. Goal difference; 2. Goals scored; 3. Away goals scored; 4. Drawing of lots. The winners and runners-up of each group advanced to the round of 16.

Groups
The matches were played on February 12–14, 19–21, 26–28, March 5–7, 12–14, April 2–4, 9–11, and 16–18, 2013.

Group 1

Group 2

Group 3

Group 4

Group 5

Group 6

Group 7

Group 8

References

External links
 
Copa Libertadores, CONMEBOL.com 

2